The 2017–18 Fairfield Stags men's basketball team represented Fairfield University during the 2017–18 NCAA Division I men's basketball season. The Stags, led by seventh-year head coach Sydney Johnson, played their home games at Webster Bank Arena, with three games at Alumni Hall, as members of the Metro Atlantic Athletic Conference. They finished the season 17–16 overall, 9–9 in MAAC play to finish in a tie for fifth place. As the No. 6 seed at the MAAC tournament, they defeated No. 11 seed Marist, upset No. 3 seed Niagara and No. 7 seed Quinnipiac to advance to the championship game where they lost to Iona.

Previous season
The Stags finished the 2016–17 season 16–15, 11–9 in MAAC play to finish in fifth place. They lost in the quarterfinals of the MAAC tournament to Siena. They were invited to the CollegeInsider.com Tournament where they lost in the first round to UMBC.

Roster

Schedule and results

|-
!colspan=9 style=| Exhibition

|-
!colspan=9 style=| Non-conference regular season

|-
!colspan=9 style=| MAAC regular season

|-
!colspan=9 style=| MAAC tournament

References

Fairfield Stags men's basketball seasons
Fairfield
Fairfield
Fairfield